The 2003 Tuvalu A-Division was the third season of association football competition. The league was won by FC Niutao for the third consecutive time.

References

Tuvalu A-Division seasons
Tuvalu
football